Sun Cloud was an on-demand Cloud computing service operated by Sun Microsystems prior to its acquisition by Oracle Corporation. The Sun Cloud Compute Utility provided access to a substantial computing resource over the Internet for US$1 per CPU-hour. It was launched as Sun Grid in March 2006. It was based on and supported open source technologies such as Solaris 10, Sun Grid Engine, and the Java platform. 
 
Sun Cloud delivered enterprise computing power and resources over the Internet, enabling developers, researchers, scientists and businesses to optimize performance, speed time to results, and accelerate innovation without investment in IT infrastructure.

In early 2010 Oracle announced it was discontinuing the Sun Cloud project. Since Sunday, March 7, 2010, the network.com web site has been inaccessible.

Suitable applications
A typical application that could run on the Compute Utility fit the following parameters:

 must be self-contained
 runs on the Solaris 10 Operating System (OS)
 is implemented with standard object libraries included with the Solaris 10 OS or user libraries packaged with the executable
 all executable code must be available on the Compute Utility at time of execution
 runs to completion under control of shell scripts (no requirement for interactive access)
 has a total maximum size of applications and data that does not exceed 10 gigabytes
 can be packaged for upload to Sun Cloud as one or more ZIP files of 300 megabytes or smaller

Resources, jobs, and runs
Resources are collections of files that contain the user's data and executable.

Jobs are a Compute Utility concept that define the elements of the unit of work that is
submitted to the Sun Cloud Compute Utility. The major elements of a job include the name of
the shell script controlling program execution, required arguments to the shell script, and a list of resources that must be in place for the job to run.

A run is a specific instantiation of a Job description submitted to the Sun Cloud Compute
Utility. Runs occur when the job is submitted to the Compute Utility for execution.

CPU-hour
For each job one submits and runs on the Cloud, the Sun Cloud CPU usage is aggregated and then rounded up to the nearest whole hour. For example, if a job used 1000 CPUs for one minute, it would be aggregated as 1000 CPU minutes or 16.67 CPU hours. The software rounds this up to 17 hours and the job would be billed as US$17.

Application catalog
On March 13, 2007, Sun announced the launch of Application Catalog, an online service that allows developers and ISVs to develop and publish their applications, enabling communities of scientists and academics in life sciences, education, engineering, and other fields to accelerate innovation and complete research projects quickly and less expensively.

The Network.com Application Catalog gives users immediate online access to popular ISV and open-source applications through an easy-to-use Web portal with no contractual obligation. Users can upload and run their own applications and create a personal library of favorites or take advantage of the pre-installed and configured applications giving them instant productivity. The portal gives them everything they need to conduct analysis and complete complex computational tasks to help speed scientific discovery and shorten the time to market for new products. They simply select the application, upload their data, and get results fast.

Network.com enables anyone to publish applications to the Application Catalog and take advantage of the powerful Solaris 10-based Cloud platform. Users can publish their own applications to a private library and access them whenever they want; they can also share their applications with others while retaining their data securely in their private space.

Available applications
Applications available on the Catalog include (by category):
 General - Blender, FDS
 Computer Aided Engineering - Calculix, deal.II, Elmer Solver, Impact, FreeFEM, OFELI
 Life Sciences - BLAST, FASTA, GROMACS, Clustalw, eHITS, T-Coffee, fastDNAml, READSEQ

Examples of types of suitable applications include:
 Bio informatics
 Financial domain applications, like Monte Carlo method, Black–Scholes option pricing models
 Computer Arts, like Fractal landscape generation
 Speech synthesis applications, like Festival
 Scientific applications, like Computer simulation

See also
 Big Buck Bunny - an open content animated film rendered on Sun Cloud 
 Utility computing

References

External links
Sun Cloud
Utility Computing
Sun Grid Engine Source
Sun Grid Module Suite for NetBeans IDE

Cloud computing providers
Cloud infrastructure
Cloud platforms
Cloud storage
Sun Microsystems